El Durazno may refer to:
 El Durazno, Argentina, a village in Catamarca Province, Argentina
 El Durazno, O'Higgins, a village in O'Higgins Region, Chile
 El Durazno, Coquimbo, a village in Coquimbo Region, Chile